Claudio Castellini (born 3 March 1966) is an Italian comic book artist.  According to his website, Castellini has a "love for technical details, influenced by artists like Neal Adams and John Buscema".

Biography 
Castellini's first work was the March 1989 episode for the Italian horror series Dylan Dog  published by Sergio Bonelli Editore. It was followed by a second Dylan Dog story in September 1990. In 1991 Castellini collaborated in the graphic elaboration of Nathan Never, a science fiction series whose covers he drew until issue #59.

His first work for Marvel Comics was Silver Surfer: Dangerous Artifacts, a Silver Surfer graphic novel written by Ron Marz, published in June 1996. He produced covers for Cosmic Powers Unlimited and Elektra Magazine, drew Fantastic Four Unlimited from 1993 to 1995, and worked on the intercompany crossover miniseries, DC vs. Marvel.

Castellini others works include Spider-Man, Conan the Barbarian and Batman: Gotham Knights. He drew the 100-page comic book one-shot Man and Superman in 2019 with writer Marv Wolfman.

Bibliography

CrossGen 
CrossGen Chronicles #1 (2000)
CrossGen Sampler (vol. 1) #1 (2000)

Dark Horse 
Dark Horse Presents #137 (1998)
Star Wars Tales (vol. 1) #1-2 (1999)

DC/Wildstorm 
Green Lantern Gallery (pinup) #1 (1996)
Batman: Gotham Knights #19 (2001)
Robotech (variant cover) #5 (2003)
Thundercats: The Return (variant cover) #4 (2003)
America's Best Comics (tpb) (2004)
Batman: Gotham Knights #69-74 (covers only) (2005)
Superman/Batman (variant cover) #37-38 (2007)
Countdown #22, 24-26 (2007)
Joker's Asylum II: Harley Quinn #1 one shot (2010)
Man and Superman (one-shot) (2019)

DC and Marvel 
DC vs. Marvel  #1-4 (DC, 1996)

Dynamite Entertainment 
Red Sonja (vol. 1) #14 (2006)

Marvel 
Fantastic Four: Unlimited (vol. 1) # 4 (1993)
Fantastic Four: Unlimited (vol. 1) #5-8 (1994)
Starblast (vol. 1) #1 (1994)
Silver Surfer: Annual (Pinup)  #7 (1994)
Marvel Swimsuit Spezial (Pinup) (vol. 1) #3 (1994)
Official Marvel Index to the X-Men #5 (1994)
Fantastic Four: Unlimited (vol. 1) #9 (1995)
Fantastic Four: Unlimited (vol. 1) #10-13 (1995)
Cosmic Powers: Unlimited (vol. 1) #1-4 (1995)
Captain Marvel (vol. 1) #1 (1995)
Elektra Megazine #1-2 (1996)
Silver Surfer: Dangerous Artifacts (vol.1) #1 (1996)
Peter Parker: Spider-Man (vol. 1) #77 (1997)
Conan the Barbarian: Conan and the Stalker of the Woods (vol. 2) #1-3 (1997)
Conan the Barbarian: River of Blood  (vol. 1) #1-3 (1998)
Shadow & Light (vol. 1) #3 (1998)
Blade: Sins of the Father  #1 (1998)
X-Men Unlimited (vol. 1) #23 (1998)
The Mighty Thor: Lord of Asgard (vol. 2) #57,66 (2003)
Captain Marvel (vol. 4) #9 (2003)
Wolverine: The End (vol. 1) #1-6 (2004)
Fantastic Four: Foes #6 (2005)

Sergio Bonelli Editore 
Dylan Dog #30 and 48 (1989–1990)
Nathan Never #1 (1991)
Nathan Never #1-59 (1991–1996, only cover)
Nathan Never Speciale #1-5 (1992–1995, only cover)

Miscellaneous 
Best Comics #24
Comic Art:Nathan Never #85 (1991)
Comic Art:Nathan Never #100 (1993)
Comic Art:Nathan Never #101 (1993)
Silver Surfer (Preview) #0 (1995)
Batman Black & White  #2 (2002)

References

External links 

Comic Book Pros – Original Comic Art For Sale, represents Claudio Castellini

Artists from Rome
Living people
1966 births
Italian comics artists